The Lichfield House Compact was an 1835 agreement between the Whig government, the Irish Repeal Party (led by Daniel O'Connell) and the Radicals to act as one body against the Conservative Party.  It allowed O'Connell to push for further reforms for Ireland.  It was signed in February 1835 in Lichfield House, St James's, residence of Thomas Anson, 1st Earl of Lichfield.

The Compact has been argued by historians such as Robert Stewart to have been the moment of formation of the Liberal Party. However, the Compact was formed in opposition to the Peelite faction, and some argue that it was the Peelites whose contribution to Liberal ideology played a dominant role in later years.

A number of supporters of Daniel O'Connell saw this agreement as a betrayal of their hopes for a repeal of the Act of Union.

Many voters saw the alliance as dangerous.  However, the Whigs and their Radical and Repeal allies won a majority in the January 1835 general election, and in April their leader Lord Melbourne replaced Peel as Prime Minister.

See also
Tithe Commutation Act

References

Christine Kinealy 'Repeal and Revolution. 1848 in Ireland' (Manchester University Press, 2009)

1830s in the United Kingdom